A pub church is a Christian Church which meets in a public house or similar establishment. Their purpose is to exist as an authentic Christian community, but in a way which is both provocative and accessible to un-churched people. Thornton recognises that the closure of public houses has diminished community space, and this is an attempt to restore this community asset.

As Archbishop Rowan Williams has commented:

This can take a number of forms. Sometimes an old public house is purchased, and used as a church building, retaining the welcome and feel of a pub.  Others rent a room in an existing pub, and church happens with the context of the functioning public house.

Examples
In the UK examples can be found in Nottingham - Eagle's Nest Church, Brighton, London - Church on the Corner, and Christ Church Balham, and Cardiff. Currently, a community of believers in Fishers, Indiana are meeting at The Pub at Pinheads under the ministry name of "Leavener;" also a group called "Connect Rome" meet at a local bar named McCrobie's in Rome, Georgia.

Critique
This has been said to be an example of what Nicholas M Healy calls "ecclesial bricolage."  The church inhabits various aspects of its culture, and attempts to use them in its mission, sometimes unaware that each aspect has both positive and negative possibilities. In this case, the advantages of mission activity may not outweigh the difficulty of demonstrating a distinct community investing in clearly different values. This is because of what might be sacrificed in order to be "relevant." Newbigin comments that the church should be both distinct from its culture and comprehensible by it. Pub church treads this fine line.

See also

 Cafe church
 Emerging Church
 List of bars
 List of public house topics
 Missional Christianity

References

External links
 The Independent article on pub churches
 BBC article on pub churches
 Leavener in Fishers, IN

Evangelical ecclesiology
Pubs
Ecclesiology